Judge Simpson may refer to:

Charles Ralph Simpson III (born 1945), judge of the United States District Court for the Western District of Kentucky
John Milton Bryan Simpson (1903–1987), judge of the United States Courta of Appeals for the Fifth and Eleventh Circuits

See also
Justice Simpson (disambiguation)